The Arap or Arab (Full Name: Muḥammad ibn ash-Shaykh Isḥāq ibn Aḥmad bin al-Ḥusayn al-Hāshimīy ) clan is a major clan of the wider Isaaq clan family and is the twin of Garhajis (Ismail), according to the clan genealogy. The Arap predominantly live on the middle and southwest side of Hargeisa and in the Baligubadle district (former Hawd region) of Somaliland, with its capital Baligubadle being an exclusively Arap territory. The territory of the clan extends to Ethiopia, in the area of Baligubadle. The Abdalle Arap, a sub-clan of the Arap clan is based in the Togdheer, Sool Hargeisa and Sahil regions.

History

Lineage 
The semi-legendary Sheikh Ishaaq ibn Ahmed was one of the Arab travellers who according to legend crossed the sea from Arabia to the Horn of Africa to spread Islam around 12th to 13th century. He is said to have been descended from the prophet Muhammad's daughter Fatimah. He is said to have married two local women from the Dir clan in Somaliland that left him eight sons, one of them being Muhammad (Arap). The purported descendants of those eight sons constitute the Isaaq clan-family.

Along with the other constituent sub-clans of the Habr Magaadle confederation (including Garhajis, Habr Awal and Ayub), the Arap too took part in the conquest of Abyssinia under the Adal Sultanate.

Role in the SNM 

Baligubadle, which straddles the border between Ethiopia and Somaliland, was the headquarters of the Somali National Movement (SNM) during the Somaliland War of Independence  from the regime of general Siad Barre.

The Araps were heavily involved in the SNM and led the first military offensive of the SNM near Baligubadle where a small force attacked a fuel tanker supplying the Somali Revolutionary Socialist Party regime's base in the town. This operation was organised by local commanders without prior planning utilizing a local force of clansmen based at the organisation's Lanqeyrta base in Hawd. 

Hassan Isse Jama was also one of original founders of the SNM in London. He was also the first vice president of Somaliland and served as the deputy chairman of the SNM. Furthermore in 1983, Sultan Mohamed Sultan Farah of the Arap clan was the first sultan to leave Somalia to Ethiopia and openly cooperate with the SNM. 

The Araps were the first clan to disarm their military unit (the 10th division under Guutada Sheekh Sancaani) and hand over their weapons after the liberation of Somaliland. Sultan Mohamed Sultan Farah agreed to lead the process of demobilization. This put pressure on other clans to follow suit, and, in early 1994, a well-staged ceremony was held in the Hargeysa football stadium to hand over weapons, playing an instrumental role in the Somaliland peace process.

Arap Clan tree 
The Arap clan is divided into the following sub-clans:

Sheikh Ishaaq Bin Ahmed (Sheikh Ishaaq)
Muhammad (Arap)
 'Sh Osman Arap
 Abdallah Arap
Eli Arap
Musa Eli (This section lives near the vicinity of Harar with the Barsuug of Dir)
Zubayr Eli
Mohammad Eli
Abokor Mohammed
Hashim Abokor
'Umar Hashim
Hussein Hashin
Musa 'Umar
Saleban 'Umar
Isma'il Saleban (Reer Isma'il)
Ali Saleban (Reer Ali Ade)
'Abdallah 'Umar
Adan 'Abdallah (Warabe)
'Ali 'Abdallah (Rer 'Ali)
Ahmad 'Abdallah
Musa Abokor
Mahamoud Musa (Afyare)
'Abdallah Musa
Mohammed Musa (Fanax)
Yusuf Musa
Abdallah Abokor
Gulane 'Abdallah
Samane 'Abdallah
Hussein Samane
Yusuf Samane
Mahamoud Samane The Sultan of Arab's Royal Lineage

Notable Arap people 
 Hassan Isse Jama - One of the founding fathers of the SNM in London. Former Deputy chair of SNM, First vice president of Somaliland.
 Edna Adan Ismail - The first Somali woman to study in Britain, first qualified nurse-midwife, and former foreign minister of Somaliland.
 Farah Nur - Legendary Somali poet from late 1800s- early 1900s
Sultan Mohamed Sultan Farah - Former Sultan of the Arap clan and commander of the SNM's 10th division
Abdilahi Husein Iman Darawal -  Somaliland politician and former SNM commander  
Abdullahi Abdi Omar "Jawaan" - Somaliland politician and introducer of the National emblem of Somaliland   
 Abdillahi Fadal Iman - former Chief of Somaliland Police Force 
 Ahmed Osman (Also known as "Ina Geele-Arap") - Business tycoon in Djibouti and Somaliland and founder of Somaliland Beverage Industries (SBI) 
 Siad Sadiq, mentioned in the Geoffrey Archer's 1916 important members of Darawiish haroun list 
Ahmed Abdi Godane - was emir of Alshabaab
 Essa Kayd  is a Somaliland politician who currently serves as Minister of Foreign Affairs (Somaliland)
Sada Mire- Archeologist

References 

Somali clans
Isaaq Sultanate